The Cricket Writers' Club Young Cricketer of the Year is an annual cricket award, presented to the young player who is adjudged to have been the best of the year in English county cricket. The award has been presented since the 1950 season and the winner is chosen by a vote amongst the members of the Cricket Writers' Club. Only players that are qualified to represent the England cricket team, and are aged under 23 on 1 May of the awarding year, are eligible for the prize. With the exception of 1986, when a joint award was made, the accolade has been presented to one individual each season. The award has been described by the England and Wales Cricket Board (ECB) as "prestigious". Although not a firm rule, once a player has won the award, they are considered ineligible to receive it in the future.

Archie Ledbrooke, a sports reporter for the Daily Mirror and the first treasurer of the Cricket Writers' Club, came up with the idea for the award. It was first presented in 1950, when Roy Tattersall of Lancashire was the recipient. In 1986, the vote was tied, and the award was made jointly to Ashley Metcalfe of Nottinghamshire and James Whitaker of Leicestershire. The 1995 winner, Andrew Symonds, went on to make over 200 international appearances for Australia, but at the time of his award was eligible to play for England, as he was born in Birmingham. , representatives of seventeen of the eighteen first-class cricket counties have won the award; no player from Worcestershire has ever won. Yorkshire players have collected the award most frequently, doing so on eleven occasions. Only seven winners have not gone on to play international cricket.

On eleven occasions, the Cricket Writers' Club Young Cricketer of the Year has also been named one of the five Wisden Cricketers of the Year for that season. Since 1990, 17 of the 31 winners have also collected the PCA Young Player of the Year award, selected by members of the players' trade union, the Professional Cricketers' Association.

Key
  Player still active
 Number in parentheses indicates number of international appearances as captain.
 Statistics correct as of 28 March 2021, the end of the England tour of India.
 Tests – indicates how many appearances the player made in Test cricket during their career.
 ODIs – indicates how many appearances the player made in One Day International cricket during their career.
 T20Is – indicates how many appearances the player made in Twenty20 International cricket during their career.

Winners

See also
Bradman Young Cricketer of the Year for best young Australian cricketer

Notes

References

General

Specific

Cricket awards and rankings
British sports trophies and awards